Judo competitions at the 2015 Parapan American Games in Toronto were held from August 12 to 14 at the Abilities Centre, win Whitby, Ontario.

Medal table

Medalists
The medalists:

Men's events

Women's events

Participating nations
A total of 10 nations sent their athletes to Judo tournaments.

See also
Judo at the 2016 Summer Paralympics

References

External links
 

Events at the 2015 Parapan American Games
2015
American Games,Para